The Leptopeltidaceae are a family of fungi with an uncertain taxonomic placement in the class Dothideomycetes.

Genera
As accepted by GBIF;
 Dothiopeltis  (2)
 Leptopeltis  (9)
 Moesziella (1)
 Nannfeldtia  (2)
 Opegraphellomyces (1)
 Phacidina  (1)
 Ronnigeria  (1)
 Staibia  (1)

Figures in brackets are approx. how many species per genus.

References

External links
Index Fungorum

Microthyriales